Portage was a federal electoral district in Manitoba, Canada, that was represented in the House of Commons of Canada from 1968 to 1979.

This riding was created in 1966 from parts of Lisgar,  Portage—Neepawa, Selkirk, Springfield, and St. Boniface  ridings

It was abolished in 1976 when it was redistributed into Lisgar, Portage—Marquette, Winnipeg North, Selkirk—Interlake, Winnipeg North Centre and Winnipeg—Assiniboine ridings.

Election results

See also 

 List of Canadian federal electoral districts
 Past Canadian electoral districts

External links 

Former federal electoral districts of Manitoba